Gentian Mezani (born 13 October 1979) is an Albanian football coach who is the current manager of Laçi in the Kategoria Superiore.

Coaching career

Flamurtari Vlorë
Mezani was named the new coach of Flamurtari Vlorë on 25 October 2016 following the departure of Gugash Magani. The club administrator Sinan Idrizi stated that Mezani would remain coach of Flamurtari until the end of 2016–17 season. In his debut match two days later, Flamurtari drew Tërbuni Pukë 3–3 thanks to a last-minute equalizer by Tomislav Bušić in the first leg of 2016–17 Albanian Cup's second round. In the post-match interview, Mezani said that draw was a "fair result".

Managerial record

References

External links
Gentian Mezani at Footballdatabase

1975 births
Living people
Sportspeople from Vlorë
Albanian football managers
Flamurtari Vlorë managers
KF Laçi managers
Luftëtari Gjirokastër managers
SC Gjilani managers
Kategoria Superiore managers
Albanian expatriate football managers
Expatriate football managers in Kosovo
Albanian expatriate sportspeople in Kosovo